Long Lake is the name of several lakes in the U.S. state of Michigan:

*Note on lakes that span more than one county: The county column only shows the first county returned by GNIS in this column.

References

See also 

 Long Lake, Michigan, a community in Plainfield Township, Iosco County
 Long Lake Township, Michigan, in Grand Traverse County
 Long Lake (disambiguation)

Long Lake
Long